Scrabble ME is a variation on the classic board game Scrabble, where each player plays on their own small board as opposed to all players playing on one main shared board. It was published by Winning Moves Games USA in 2008 but is no longer in production.

Gameplay 
The gameplay is a bit different from normal Scrabble, due to each player having their own board.  Each turn, players build words on their boards simultaneously.  Once all players do this, the round ends and players score their words.  After each round, players have the option to choose a replacement letter from the bag or, in another change from the classic version, select one of the face-up tiles on the raised tile holder.

Another new feature is an addition to the rules regarding the wild tile. Each time a wild tile is played, the player who utilizes the tile must swap boards with an opponent, thwarting his strategy.

The game ends when all tiles are in use and the final word has been played.  The player with the highest score wins.

External links 
 BoardGameGeek Scrabble Me page, Link to the game on Boardgamegeek.com

Board games introduced in 2008
Scrabble variants